"Señorita" is a song by Canadian singer Shawn Mendes and Cuban-American singer Camila Cabello. It was released on June 21, 2019, through Island and Epic Records as the second single (seventh overall) from the deluxe edition of Mendes' self-titled third studio album and later included on Cabello's second studio album Romance (2019). The song was written by Mendes, Cabello, Charli XCX, Ali Tamposi, Jack Patterson, and its producers Andrew Watt, Benny Blanco, and Cashmere Cat.

The song marks Mendes and Cabello's second collaboration, following "I Know What You Did Last Summer" from Mendes' debut album, Handwritten (2015). "Señorita" reached number one on the US Billboard Hot 100, as well as topping the charts in a record setting 40 countries worldwide. It is certified multiplatinum in thirteen countries, including Diamond in France, Mexico, and Poland. "Señorita" received highly positive reviews from music critics. The single has won an American Music Award, two MTV Video Music Awards, a People's Choice Award, and received a nomination for a Grammy Award for Best Pop Duo/Group Performance. The song was the biggest song of 2019 in Malaysia and according to the International Federation of the Phonographic Industry (IFPI), it was the third best-selling single of 2019 worldwide, with combined sales and track-equivalent streams of 16.1 million units globally. As of October 2021 it is the 9th most streamed song on Spotify.

Background
The song was originally conceived during a studio session between Charli XCX, Ali Tamposi, Jack Patterson of Clean Bandit, and Andrew Watt, the last of whom produced the song. Watt, prior to the studio session, created a guitar melody that he described as being reminiscent of Fleetwood Mac and José Feliciano. He played the guitar melody during the studio session where ideas for melodies and lyrics were created to accompany it. The melody and lyrics for the chorus of the song eventually formed, including what would become the opening line, "I love it when you call me señorita".

Watt sent the rough chorus of the song to Shawn Mendes, suggesting that the song be recorded as a duet, to which Mendes agreed and said that Camila Cabello would be "the only person" with whom he could do the song. Watt then sent the song to producers Benny Blanco and Cashmere Cat who liked it and began to work together on the production of the song, deciding to keep it simple to make room for the vocals.

Mendes and Cabello both made changes to the melody and lyrics to their liking. After the song's key changed and Cabello recorded some vocals, Watt had a flight to England and planned to record Mendes' vocals on a day off from his tour after his Manchester Arena show. However, Watt, to Mendes' amusement, accidentally blew the microphone by forgetting to change the conversion of power to 220V on the power box. This forced Watt to record Mendes' vocals at the Birmingham Arena, angering Mendes throughout the process because he wanted to preserve his voice for his then-upcoming shows at the O2 Arena.

Mendes and Cabello had worked together on writing lyrics through FaceTime until they met up at a studio a mere few weeks before the song was released. Cabello had been tweaking lyrics and recorded vocals multiple times. Cabello conceived the lyric, "You say we're just friends but friends don't know the way you taste", as the song was already in the process of being mixed, forcing Mendes to record new vocals and sing new harmonies. Their chemistry in the studio was lauded by producer Benny Blanco, who praised their talent and "energy in the room".

Musical style
"Señorita" is a Latin pop song, written in the key of A minor, with a common time tempo of 117 BPM. The song features vocals from both Cabello and Mendes.

Music video
The song's official video was premiered on YouTube on June 21, 2019. The video, directed by Dave Meyers, filmed in Los Angeles, sees Mendes and Cabello in Miami.  Cabello portrays a waitress working at a small diner, and Mendes is a newcomer to the city. They meet at the diner, and later see each other at a party. He then takes her on a motorcycle ride and they go to a hotel where they proceed to make love. In the end, however, they are separated, and it ends with Mendes looking out into the ocean and Cabello being consoled by a fellow waitress on their break. As of October 2021, it has reached over 1.3 billion views.

The video received positive reviews online, Teen Vogue described the music video as "steamy" and "complete with a health dose of romantic salsa dancing and heartbreak" Bustle said the song "keeps things appropriately hot and steamy" and Metro UK called the video "sizzling".

Promotion 
Both Mendes and Cabello first hinted at a collaboration in December 2018. They began teasing the project on social media in June 2019, with each sharing a 20-second video teaser. They uploaded teasers of the song's music video to their social media accounts on June 19, 2019. The former confirmed it as a single later that day along with its release date and artwork.

Live performances
Mendes and Cabello performed the single at the 2019 MTV Video Music Awards on August 26, 2019. On September 5, 2019, Cabello performed an acoustic version of the song on Elles Women in Music Party presented by Spotify in The Shed On September 6, during the Shawn Mendes: The Tour live show in Rogers Centre, Toronto, Mendes and Cabello performed "Señorita". Cabello also performed a solo version of the song at the 2019 iHeartRadio Festival, and at a private fan performance hosted by Verizon. On November 24, 2019, Mendes and Cabello performed the song at the American Music Awards. On September 26, 2021, Mendes and Cabello performed the song at the 2021 Global Citizen Live. On May 28, 2022, Cabello performed the song in the 2022 UEFA Champions League Final.

Mendes has added the single to his setlist on his ongoing tour, as a medley with "I Know What You Did Last Summer"—which Cabello also features in—and "Mutual".

Critical reception
Shaad D'Souza from The Fader praised the single for being effortlessly steamy and wonderfully lightweight, concluding that although Cabello is clear MVP, the song would fizzle without Mendes as her foil. TJ Lovell from Medium called the track a sexy ode to a vacation rendezvous that allows the pair to flex their undeniable chemistry on and off the mic. Lovell ended by giving the song 4 out of 5 stars, and called it a fun if unremarkable track that'll sound right at home in Mendes' and Cabello's discographies.

Commercial performance
"Señorita" debuted at number two on the Billboard Hot 100 on July 6, 2019. It later peaked at number one on the chart issue dated August 31, 2019 dethroning Billie Eilish's "Bad Guy", becoming Mendes' first US number-one song and Cabello's second after "Havana". Cabello became the youngest female artist to achieve a second Hot 100 number one and a fourth Mainstream Top 40 chart-topper since Rihanna (2010). It was replaced by Lizzo's "Truth Hurts" the following week. The single was the most-streamed song on Spotify in 2019 and 9th overall. It charted on the Billboard Hot 100 for 37 weeks. After the introduction of Billboard Global 200 in September 2020, "Señorita" peaked at 67 on the chart.

In the UK "Señorita" debuted at number two on the UK Official Charts and reached number one in its 3rd week on the 18th July 2019, and spent 5 weeks in the top spot, it then charted for a further 40 weeks. It has been certified as 2× Platinum in the UK.

In Canada "Señorita" hit number one on the Canadian Hot 100, Canada AC, Canada CHR/Top 40 and the Canada Hot AC. On the Canadian Hot 100 it hit number one on the 31 August 2019, and charted for 52 weeks.

"Señorita" reached number one in over 30 countries, including Canada, the UK, Australia and New Zealand. It made several year end charts, hitting number 10 on the UK Singles list, number 8 on ARIA charts, 9 on the New Zealand year end list, 10 on the year end Canadian Hot 100 and 15 on the US Billboard Hot 100 year end list, as well as number 15 on the US Rolling Stone Top 100 year end list.

The song has been certified Platinum in the United States by the Recording Industry Association of America, 2× Platinum in the United Kingdom by the British Phonographic Industry and 6× Platinum in Australia by the Australian Recording Industry Association. It has been certified Platinum in 3 countries, and multi-Platinum in a further 11 countries, and Diamond in Poland, France and Mexico.

As of January 2023, "Señorita" is the 9th most streamed song on Spotify with 2.32 billion streams and is the highest charting collaboration.

In other media
Jennifer Lopez and Jimmy Fallon recreated the choreography of the video of "Señorita" and other videos in a new The Tonight Show segment, "The History of Music Video Dancin". The song is featured in the dance rhythm game, Just Dance 2021. The song is featured in the film Sing 2.

Awards and nominations

Track listing
 7-inch vinyl, cassette single, CD single and picture disc
 "Señorita" – 3:04
 Digital download and streaming
 "Señorita" – 3:04

Credits and personnel
Credits adapted from Tidal.
 Shawn Mendes – vocals, lyrics, composition, guitar
 Camila Cabello – vocals, lyrics, composition
 Andrew Watt – backing vocals, composition, production, programming, bass, guitar
 Benny Blanco – composition, production, programmer, keyboards
 Cashmere Cat – composition, additional production, programming, keyboards
 Ali Tamposi – lyrics, composition
 Jack Patterson – composition
 Charli XCX – composition
 Paul LaMalfa – engineering, vocal engineering
 John Hanes – mixing engineering
 Serban Ghenea – mixing
 Nathaniel Alford – vocal engineering
 Zubin Thakkar – vocal engineering
 Pedro Sisco - songwriting, lyrics

Charts

Weekly charts

Monthly charts

Year-end charts

Certifications

Release history

See also

 List of airplay number-one hits of the 2010s (Argentina)
 List of Billboard Argentina Hot 100 top-ten singles in 2019
 List of Billboard Hot 100 number-one singles of 2019
 List of Canadian Hot 100 number-one singles of 2019
 List of most-streamed songs on Spotify
 List of number-one singles of 2019 (Australia)
 List of number-one hits of 2019 (Austria)
 List of number-one singles of 2019 (Belgium)
 List of number-one hits of 2019 (Denmark)
 List of number-one singles of 2019 (Finland)
 List of number-one hits of 2019 (Germany)
 List of number-one singles of the 2010s (Hungary)
 List of number-one singles of 2019 (Ireland)
 List of number-one hits of 2019 (Italy)
 List of number-one songs of 2019 (Malaysia)
 List of number-one singles of 2019 (Netherlands)
 List of number-one singles from the 2010s (New Zealand)
 List of number-one songs in Norway
 List of number-one singles of 2019 (Poland)
 List of number-one singles of 2019 (Portugal)
 List of number-one songs of the 2010s (Romania)
 List of number-one songs of 2019 (Singapore)
 List of number-one singles of 2019 (Spain)
 List of number-one singles of the 2010s (Sweden)
 List of number-one hits of 2019 (Switzerland)
 List of UK Singles Chart number ones of the 2010s

References

External links
 

2019 singles
2019 songs
Camila Cabello songs
Shawn Mendes songs
Billboard Hot 100 number-one singles
Canadian Hot 100 number-one singles
Irish Singles Chart number-one singles
Island Records singles
Male–female vocal duets
Number-one singles in Australia
Number-one singles in Austria
Number-one singles in Denmark
Number-one singles in the Commonwealth of Independent States
Number-one singles in Finland
Number-one singles in Greece
Number-one singles in Hungary
Number-one singles in Iceland
Number-one singles in Israel
Number-one singles in Italy
Number-one singles in Malaysia
Number-one singles in New Zealand
Number-one singles in Norway
Number-one singles in Poland
Number-one singles in Portugal
Number-one singles in Romania
Number-one singles in Russia
Number-one singles in Singapore
Number-one singles in Sweden
Number-one singles in Switzerland
Songs written by Shawn Mendes
Songs written by Camila Cabello
Songs written by Andrew Watt (record producer)
Songs written by Benny Blanco
Songs written by Ali Tamposi
Songs written by Charli XCX
Songs written by Jack Patterson (Clean Bandit)
Songs written by Cashmere Cat
Song recordings produced by Benny Blanco
Song recordings produced by Cashmere Cat
Ultratop 50 Singles (Wallonia) number-one singles
UK Singles Chart number-one singles
Latin pop songs
Music videos directed by Dave Meyers (director)
Juno Award for Single of the Year singles
Song recordings produced by Andrew Watt (record producer)